Ang Chee Sia Ong Temple is a Chinese temple affiliated to Taoism, Chinese Buddhism and Confucianism, it is located in West Coast, Singapore. The main hall is dedicated to the Lord Green Dragon, also known as Ang Chee Sia Ong.

The temple was established in 1918 when the incense ashes of the original Green Dragon Temple at Han River, Chaozhou, Guangdong, China was brought over to Singapore by Wang Dong Qing and worshipped at his home.

In 1930, a temple was established at Pasir Panjang's 7th Milestone for public worship to Ang Chee Sia Ong. The temple land was later slated for redevelopment and the temple moved to West Coast Drive. The temple was formally consecrated in 1997.

Gallery

References

External links

Official website of the Ang Chee Sia Ong Temple

Buddhist temples in Singapore
Confucian temples
Taoist temples in Singapore
Religious buildings and structures completed in 1997
20th-century architecture in Singapore